Patrick Zonneveld (born 17 March 1988) is a Dutch professional footballer who plays for AFC.

Career
He left in July 2010 his club HFC Haarlem and joined to ADO '20.

Notes

1988 births
Living people
People from Heemskerk
Dutch footballers
HFC Haarlem players
Eerste Divisie players
Tweede Divisie players
Derde Divisie players
ADO '20 players
IJsselmeervogels players
Amsterdamsche FC players
Association football goalkeepers
Footballers from North Holland